Frederick Peter Guengerich is a professor of biochemistry and the director of the Center in Molecular Toxicology at Vanderbilt University, Nashville, Tennessee. Guengerich is the author or co-author of over 500 peer-reviewed scientific articles, and a researcher in toxicology working on cytochromes P450, DNA damage and carcinogenesis, and drug metabolism. In 2005 he received the William C. Rose Award for his research.

References

External links
Vanderbilt University Center in Molecular Toxicology

American biochemists
Living people
Vanderbilt University faculty
Year of birth missing (living people)
Fellows of the American Society for Pharmacology and Experimental Therapeutics